Vasić is a Serbian surname, a patronymic derived from Vasa and Vaso (diminutives of Vasilije and Vasoje).

Geographical distribution
As of 2014, 77.3% of all known bearers of the surname Vasić were residents of Serbia (frequency 1:285), 14.9% of Bosnia and Herzegovina (1:731), 5.1% of Kosovo (1:1,122) and 1.4% of Croatia (1:9,418).

In Serbia, the frequency of the surname was higher than national average (1:285) in the following districts:
 1. Mačva District (1:79)
 2. Pomoravlje District (1:121)
 3. Rasina District (1:143)
 4. Braničevo District (1:153)
 5. Podunavlje District (1:160)
 6. Kolubara District (1:188)
 7. Nišava District (1:265)
 8. Belgrade (1:270)
 9. Toplica District (1:284)

People
 Aleksandar Vasić (basketball) (born 1987), Serbian basketball player
 Aleksandar Vasić (politician), deputy chairman of the State Broadcasting Agency Council in the Republic of Serbia
Bane Vasic, American engineer
Dejan Vasić (born 1980), Serbian footballer
Đurađ Vasić (born 1956), Serbian footballer and manager
Jovan Vasić (born 1987), Serbian footballer
Kara-Marko Vasić (fl. 1804–15), Serbian Revolutionary
Milan Vasić (1928–2003), Serbian historian
Miloš Vasić (born 1991), Serbian rower
Nenad Vasić (born 1979), Serbian footballer
Nikola Vasić (born 1984), Serbian basketball player
Radojica Vasić (born 1976), Serbian footballer
Sonja Vasić (born 1989), Serbian basketball player

See also
Vasović
Vasojević
Vasiljević

References

Serbian surnames
Patronymic surnames
Surnames from given names